George Barnabas Kirya, MBChB, MMed, MSc, Dip.Bact., LLD (Honorary), is a Ugandan physician, academic, microbiologist, politician, and diplomat. He served as the chairman of the Uganda Health Services Commission from 2007 to 2012. Previously, from 1997 until 2003, he served as Uganda's High Commissioner to the United Kingdom.

Background and education
He was born at Ngora Hospital in 1939 to Joshua Kirya, a Mugwere from the Eastern Region, and Miriam Najjemba a Muganda from Uganda's Central Region. Kirya attended Busoga College Mwiri for his O-Level studies.

He then transferred to Mbale Secondary School for his A-Level education. In 1961, he entered the Makerere University School of Medicine, where he graduated with a Bachelor of Medicine and Bachelor of Surgery degree in 1966. He then obtained a Master of Science in Microbiology in 1971 from the University of Birmingham in the United Kingdom. His diploma in Bacteriology was obtained from the University of Manchester in 1975. In 2001, in recognition of his service as a diplomat, the University of Birmingham awarded him an honorary Doctor of Laws degree.

Career
Following his internship at Mulago Hospital, Kirya joined the Master of Medicine postgraduate program, speculating in microbiology. Upon graduation from the MMed program, he joined the East African Virus Research Institute (EAVRI), a department of the East African Community, which is now known as the Uganda Virus Research Institute. He served as a research officer before becoming the principal medical research officer and head of arbovirology at EAVRI. 
 
From 1970 until 1973, he served as visiting lecturer in the Department of Microbiology at Makerere University School of Medicine. From 1973 to 1975, he was a senior lecturer at Makerere, teaching microbiology, surveillance, and research at undergraduate and post-graduate levels. He served as a professor and head of the Department of Medical Microbiology at Makerere from 1978 until 1986.

From April 1986 until November 1990, he served as Vice-Chancellor of Makerere University, Uganda's largest public university. In 1997, he was appointed Uganda's High Commissioner to the United Kingdom, serving in that position until 2003.

He returned to Uganda in 2003 and was appointed chairman of the Uganda Health Services Commission, serving in that capacity until 2012. Between 2007 and 2011, he served as the Chancellor of Lugazi University.

Other responsibilities
Professor George Kirya has written extensively in peer journals in the field of virology, with emphasis on arbovirology. He also writes articles in Ugandan, nationally circulated English language newspapers. He is the Chairman of the board of directors of THETA, a Ugandan NGO that aims "to improve health and access to health care through promotion of collaboration between the traditional and biomedical health care systems".

See also
 Bagwere
 Pallisa District

References

External links
Professor George Kirya Was A Victim of Gang Violence In London
Profile at Afdevinfo.com

Living people
1939 births
Makerere University alumni
Alumni of the University of Birmingham
Alumni of the University of Manchester
Ugandan diplomats
Vice-chancellors of universities in Uganda
People from Eastern Region, Uganda
High Commissioners of Uganda to the United Kingdom
People from Pallisa District
Ugandan microbiologists
People educated at Busoga College